Shawmut Diner is an historic diner formerly located at 943 Shawmut Avenue in New Bedford, Massachusetts.

The diner was built in 1953. In 1983 the Paleologos family bought and updated the diner. The diner was added to the National Register of Historic Places in 2003. It has been featured on the Food Channel.

The Shawmut Diner closed for business on March 31, 2014. It was moved to the Bristol County House of Corrections in nearby Dartmouth, Massachusetts in May 2014. It has been replaced by a Cumberland Farms.

See also
National Register of Historic Places listings in New Bedford, Massachusetts

References

1953 establishments in Massachusetts
Buildings and structures in New Bedford, Massachusetts
Commercial buildings completed in 1953
Diners on the National Register of Historic Places
Diners in Massachusetts
National Register of Historic Places in New Bedford, Massachusetts
Restaurants established in 1953
Restaurants in Massachusetts
Restaurants on the National Register of Historic Places in Massachusetts
Tourist attractions in Bristol County, Massachusetts
Restaurants disestablished in 2014